Top Trumps Adventures is a series of video games based on Top Trumps. There are three games in the series. These are:

Top Trumps Adventures for Wii
Top Trumps Adventures: Dogs and Dinosaurs
Top Trumps Adventures: Horror and Predators

The Top Trumps Adventures series is also known by the name Top Trumps Console.

See also
Top Trumps
Top Trumps (TV Programme)

Top Trumps